The Island of Sea Women is a 2019 historical novel written by American author Lisa See. Set on the Korean island of Jeju, the novel tells the story of a friendship between Mi-ja, the daughter of a Japanese collaborator, and Young-Sook, the heir apparent in a family of haenyeo. Throughout the decades from Japanese rule to the modern era, the two become close but find their relationship strained as a result of their backgrounds. 

See researched Haenyo during visit to South Korea for her next novel

References

2019 American novels
Novels by Lisa See
Novels set in Jeju Province